Bewitching Kisses is a 1937 Argentine romantic drama film musical directed and written by José A. Ferreyra, based on a story by Enrique García Velloso. Starring Libertad Lamarque and Floren Delbene.

The film tells the story of a singer estranged from her fiancé and abducted by an admirer to a backwoods hovel.

External links
 

Argentine musical drama films
1937 films
1930s Spanish-language films
Tango films
Argentine black-and-white films
Films directed by José A. Ferreyra
1930s musical drama films
1930s romantic musical films
Argentine romantic musical films
1937 drama films
1930s Argentine films